Sus strozzi, or Strozzi's pig, was a suid native to the Mediterranean region of Europe. It was more ancient than the boar, and was eventually displaced by the latter when it entered Europe during the start of the Pleistocene, 1 Mya.

Description
Strozzi's pig was larger than the modern day wild boar. One recently found fossil was a  jawbone from a male, much larger than the jawbone of any modern day species of Sus. It was possibly adapted to a swamp environment, and may have been ancestral to the modern Javan warty pig.

References

External links
Reconstruction at AmSturDam - Genealogie & Paleontologie

Sus (genus)
Pleistocene even-toed ungulates
Prehistoric Suidae
Prehistoric mammals of Europe
Pliocene even-toed ungulates
Fossil taxa described in 1881
Mammals described in 1881